Alexander Ferguson MacLaren (February 3, 1854 – April 19, 1917) was a Canadian manufacturer, exporter and politician.

Born in Perth, Lanark County, Canada West, the son of John MacLaren, a native of Perthshire, Scotland, MacLaren moved to Cromarty in Perth County with his family while still young. He was employed with a dairyman to learn cheese making but soon joined Thomas Ballantyne, a major cheese manufacturer and exporter. In 1890, MacLaren established his own cheese exporting business in Stratford. He was one of the judges at the 1893 World's Fair in Chicago and was the sole judge for the dairy products at the Toronto and Ottawa fairs. He was also President of the Ontario Dairymen's Association. MacLaren's company established offices in Toronto, Detroit, Chicago, New York City, London (England), Mexico, China, Japan and Africa. He was also president of the Imperial Wood Fibre Plaster Company, president of the Imperial Veneer Company and served on the board of directors of a number of other companies. In 1895, he married Janet McLeod.

He was first elected to the House of Commons of Canada for the electoral district of Perth North at the general elections of 1896. A Conservative, he was re-elected in 1900 and 1904. He was defeated in 1908. MacLaren died in Toronto from kidney problems.

In 1920, his company was purchased by J. L. Kraft and Brothers Company.

References
 
 The Canadian Parliament; biographical sketches and photo-engravures of the senators and members of the House of Commons of Canada. Being the tenth Parliament, elected November 3, 1904
 Biography at the Dictionary of Canadian Biography Online
 History of the County of Perth from 1825 to 1902, W Johnston (1903)

1854 births
1917 deaths
Conservative Party of Canada (1867–1942) MPs
Members of the House of Commons of Canada from Ontario
Canadian people of Scottish descent